Minypatrobus is a genus of beetles in the family Carabidae, containing the following species:

 Minypatrobus darlingtoni Ueno, 1955
 Minypatrobus hidakanus Zamotajlov & Morita, 2001
 Minypatrobus kasaharai Morita, 2002
 Minypatrobus uenoi (Habu, 1972)

References

Trechinae